Lampropeltis pyromelana, the Arizona mountain kingsnake or Sonoran mountain kingsnake, is a species of snake native to Arizona.

Distribution and habitat
Within Arizona, L. pyromelana has a discontinuous range extending from the extreme northwestern corner of the state, across the central mountain ranges and the Mogollon Rim, into the "sky island" mountain ranges of the southeast.

Ecology
L. pyromelana feeds on lizards, rodents and nestling birds. It tends to spend the daytime among rocks, logs, or dense clumps of vegetation.

References

External links
 
 Reptile database
 Reptile buzz

pyromelana
Reptiles described in 1866
Snakes of North America